Benedetto Gennari II  (October 19, 1633 – December 9, 1715) was an Italian painter active during the Baroque period.

Biography 
Belonging to a dynasty of painters, Gennari was a student of Guercino, the grandson of Benedetto Gennari, and older brother of Cesare Gennari.  His father was Ercole Gennari and mother Lucia Barbieri.  He trained at the workshop of the celebrated master, Guercino, hence his style was always very close to that of his teacher. Upon Guercino's death, Gennari inherited his studio which he ran with his brother Cesare.

With a restless spirit, Gennari traveled to Paris in March 1672 to work for the court of King Louis XIV. The French nobility received him with open arms, and the multitude of commissions encouraged him to prolong his stay. In September 1674, he moved to London where he became court painter to King Charles II of England and his successor James II. He painted allegorical and mythological scenes, and above all portraits. Catherine of Braganza and Mary of Modena, Catholic wives of Protestant kings, commissioned artworks for their private worship.

Gennari had to leave England when King James was dethroned; he followed James's court to Saint-Germain-en-Laye in 1689. By 1692, he was back in Bologna.

Gennari was an outstanding portraitist who eventually developed a style far removed from the principles taught in the school of Guercino. In the mature phase of his style, he came to acquire characteristics of the art of northern Europe, which he learned through his travels. In 1709, he was one of the founding members of the Accademia Clementina.

Selected works 
 Portrait of Guercino (National Art Gallery of Bologna)
 Santa Clara taking habits (1656–57, Santa Chiara, Pieve di Cento)
 Cleopatra (Yale Center for British Art, New Haven)
 Tales of Ovid's Metamorphoses (Hampton Court, London)
 Portrait of Hortense Mancini, Duchess of Mazarin (1674, Musée des Beaux-Arts, Valenciennes)
 Annunciation (1675, Cassa di Risparmio, Cento)
 Rinaldo and Armida (1676–78, Private Collection)
 Catherine of Braganza (1638-1705) Queen of King Charles II (1678, Portugal, Lisbon, British Embassy)
 King Charles II (1630-85) Reigned 1660-85 (1678, Portugal, Lisbon, British Embassy)
 Sagrada Familia (1682, Birmingham Museum Art Gallery)
 Sleeping Young Shepherd surprised by two women (Royal Collection)
 Death of Cleopatra (1686, Victoria Art Gallery, Bath)
 Portrait of James II of England (1686, Private Collection, NY)
 Portrait of Nathaniel Cholmley (1687, Ferens Art Gallery, Hull)
 Annunciation (1686, Ringling Museum, Sarasota)
 Elizabeth Panton as Santa Catalina (1689, Tate Gallery, London)
 Mary of Modena and his son James Stuart III (1690, Pinacoteca Civica, Modena)
 Theseus and the daughters of Minos (1702, Kunsthistorisches Museum, Vienna)
 The Miracle of Saint Francis Xavier (Saint-François Xavier des Missions étrangères, Paris)

Gallery

See also 
 Art collection of Fondazione Cassa di Risparmio di Cesena

References

External links 

 
 
 Benedetto Gennari at Artcyclopedia

Painters from Bologna
Italian Baroque painters
1633 births
1715 deaths
Italian male painters
People from Cento
17th-century Italian painters
18th-century Italian painters
18th-century Italian male artists